The Sierra Madre frog (Lithobates sierramadrensis) is a species of frog in the family Ranidae endemic to the Sierra Madre del Sur in Guerrero and Oaxaca states, Mexico. Its local name is rana de Sierra Madre Occidental. Its natural habitats are conifer forests at intermediate elevations. Breeding takes place in streams. It is threatened by habitat loss (logging) and possibly chytridiomycosis.

References

Lithobates
Endemic amphibians of Mexico
Fauna of the Sierra Madre del Sur
Taxonomy articles created by Polbot
Amphibians described in 1939